Jawahar Navodaya Vidyalaya, Gomati or locally known as JNV Banduar is a boarding, co-educational  school in Gomati district of Tripura state in India. Navodaya Vidyalayas are funded by the Indian Ministry of Human Resources Development and administered  by Navodaya Vidyalaya Smiti, an autonomous body under the ministry.

History 
The school was established in 1991, and is a part of Jawahar Navodaya Vidyalaya schools. The school was operating from temporary site at Kakraban and shifted to the permanent campus in 2001. This school is administered and monitored by Shillong regional office of Navodaya Vidyalaya Smiti. This school belonged to South Tripura district prior to January 2012, when Gomati district was carved out of South Tripura district.

Admission 
Admission to JNV Gomati at class VI level is made through selection test conducted by Navodaya Vidyalaya Smiti. The information about test is disseminated and advertised in district by the office of Gomati district magistrate (Collector), who is also chairperson of Vidyalya Management Committee.

Affiliations 
JNV Gomati is affiliated to Central Board of Secondary Education with affiliation number 2040002.

See also 
 List of JNV schools
 Jawahar Navodaya Vidyalaya, Khowai
 Jawahar Navodaya Vidyalaya, North Tripura

References

External links 

 Official Website of JNV Gomati

High schools and secondary schools in Tripura
Gomati
Educational institutions established in 1991
1991 establishments in Tripura
Gomati district